The men's 3000 metres steeplechase event at the 2020 Summer Olympics took place on 30 July and 2 August 2021 at the Japan National Stadium. 45 athletes competed.

Summary
Kenya had won this event every time it participated in the Olympics since 1968, 11 times, 9 times in a row after boycotting 1976 and 1980. That symbol of national pride placed a giant target on their back from every other country trying to win this event. 2021 looked like a good chance for Kenya's neighbor and distance running rival, Ethiopia, Lamecha Girma holding the number one and three of the top 5 times in the world coming into the Olympics.

15 men qualified through a tough round of heats. On home soil, Ryuji Miura set the Japanese National Record. A slow third heat left, among others, one Kenyan and one Ethiopian runner to watch the final from the stands.

True to form in most championships, the final started slowly with Ethiopians Girma and Getnet Wale controlling the pace from the front. About 1K in, Miura injected a little more speed, but the Ethiopians went back to the point, marked by the Kenyan duo of Abraham Kibiwott and Benjamin Kigen along with Kenyan born American Benard Keter. As they approached 3 laps to go, Girma made an effort to speed up the race, the field stringing out behind them, with only the two Ethiopians, the two Kenyans breaking away with Soufiane El Bakkali going on the back of the leaders for the ride. Through the penultimate lap, both Kenyans showed signs of weakness, losing contact on the remaining three at the bell. Duplicating the strategy of Ezekiel Kemboi, El Bakkali accelerated over the first barrier of the backstretch. Wale struggled to keep up and Kigen sprinting to regain contact as his country's last hope. Entering the final turn, El Bakkali caught Girma. With both athletes taking the water jump cleanly, behind them as Kigen was catching Wale, his lead foot caught Wale's back kick and Wale was down. Kigen quickly regained his balance while Wale lost all momentum and his chance at a medal. After gaining the advantage, El Bakkali sprinted away from Girma to take the gold with Kigen getting the bronze. El Bakkali’s gold medal was the first Olympic or Worlds gold in 34 years—going back to the 1987 World Championships in Athletics—to be won by a non-Kenyan-born athlete.

Background
This was the 24th appearance of the event, having appeared at every Olympics since 1920.

Qualification

A National Olympic Committee (NOC) could enter up to 3 qualified athletes in the men's 3000 metres steeplechase event if all athletes meet the entry standard or qualify by ranking during the qualifying period. (The limit of 3 has been in place since the 1930 Olympic Congress.) The qualifying standard is 8:22.00. This standard was "set for the sole purpose of qualifying athletes with exceptional performances unable to qualify through the IAAF World Rankings pathway." The world rankings, based on the average of the best five results for the athlete over the qualifying period and weighted by the importance of the meet, will then be used to qualify athletes until the cap of 45 is reached.

The qualifying period was originally from 1 May 2019 to 29 June 2020. Due to the COVID-19 pandemic, the period was suspended from 6 April 2020 to 30 November 2020, with the end date extended to 29 June 2021. The world rankings period start date was also changed from 1 May 2019 to 30 June 2020; athletes who had met the qualifying standard during that time were still qualified, but those using world rankings would not be able to count performances during that time. The qualifying time standards could be obtained in various meets during the given period that have the approval of the IAAF. Both indoor and outdoor meets are eligible. The most recent Area Championships may be counted in the ranking, even if not during the qualifying period.

NOCs cannot use their universality place in the 3000 metres steeplechase.

Competition format
The event continued to use the two-round format introduced in 2012.

Records
Prior to this competition, the existing world, Olympic, and area records were as follows.

The following national records were established during the competition:

Schedule
All times are Japan Standard Time (UTC+9)

The men's 3000 metres steeplechase took place over two separate days.

Results

Heats
Note: First 3 in each heat (Q) and the next 6 fastest (q) advance to the Final.

Heat 1

Heat 2

Heat 3

Final

References

Men's 3000 metres steeplechase
2020
Men's events at the 2020 Summer Olympics